The D-Motor LF39 is a lightweight liquid cooled side-valve four-stroke flat six 4 litre petrol aircraft engine, produced by D-Motor in Deerlijk, Belgium.  It is a derivative of the flat four D-Motor LF26.

Design

The power curve is virtually linear from 50 kW @ 1920 rpm to 91.55 kW @ 3100 rpm. Just like its smaller sibling, the LF26, this direct-drive aero-engine has a side-valve (flathead) valvetrain. The engine has port injection, a dry sump lubrication system, and dual ignition.

Development
With the aid of funding from the Belgian government, the D-Motor LF39 was developed from the LF26. The company encountered problems with the casting of the flat-six cylinder block and there were further problems with the flywheel/alternator, but these were solved using a lighter flywheel with neodymium magnets.

The 2014 expected price was €17,800.

In September 2014, EDM Aerotec announced the results of test flying the engine in their EDM Aerotec CoAX 2D/2R coaxial rotor helicopter, saying, "We are glad to present the 6 cylinder in action. After more than 100 hours testflying ... the coax helicopter equipped with the 6 cylinder... (proved) a perfect combination according to the test pilots." and added, "Another 6 cylinder has been installed in a test plane in Belgium".

Applications
EDM Aerotec CoAX 2D/2R
Hungaro Copter
Niki Kallithea
Niki Lightning

Specifications
Reference: D-Motor

See also

References

External links
 

Boxer engines
2000s aircraft piston engines
D-Motor aircraft engines